Frankie Burke (June 6, 1915 – April 7, 1983) was a Hollywood actor, best known for his appearance as a member of The East Side Kids.

Early life
Burke was born Frankie Vaselle and grew up in Brooklyn, New York. His name was changed when he began working in films. Burke went to P.S. 25  on Lafayette and Throop streets before going on to Alexander Hamilton (vocation) High School, now known as Paul Robeson HS, at 150 Albany Avenue. He grew up watching James Cagney on film in local theaters and, having been told many times how much he resembled him, figured if Cagney could become famous, so could he. Burke sold newspapers on the street corners before deciding to hitchhike to Hollywood in 1937 to meet Cagney, but when the first attempt failed, he went back to Brooklyn.

In 1937, Burke worked as a bellhop at a hotel in Las Vegas, Nevada.

Life in Hollywood
He was discovered by a Warner Brothers talent scout, out searching for young men who resembled Cagney for a role in 1938's Angels with Dirty Faces. Apparently, the resemblance was so astounding that Burke was hired on the spot. He went on to do eighteen more films, several of which were uncredited, before his last role in 1941's Shadow of the Thin Man.

After Hollywood
After a divorce in the 1940s, Burke returned to Nevada to work and then on to the east coast to stay with family. In the early 1960s, he opted to become a hobo and travel across the United States in freight trains.

Death
Burke died of lung cancer in 1983. He was survived by one son.

Filmography

References

External links

American male film actors
1915 births
1983 deaths
Deaths from lung cancer
Male actors from New York City
20th-century American male actors